Qasimabad is Town/City in the western side of Hyderabad City in Sindh province of Pakistan.

History
Qasimabad Town/City is named after the Arab Invader Muhammad Bin Qasim who invaded Sindh and Multan. It was formed as an extension to the city of Hyderabad after the arrival of migrants from across the border after the 1947 independence of Pakistan, along with the town of Latifabad.

The locals that lived in the town at its inception were ethnically of a mixed population but as the city experienced ethnic riots between Sindhis and Muhajir in the late 1980s. Widespread target killings and acts of ethnic cleansing were committed, the city got divided between the Sindhis and Muhajir with the former mainly settling in Qasimabad while the latter settling in Latifabad. Smaller scale hostilities still continue in the city.

Settlement
Qasimabad is a Sindhi majority Town. The Sindhis make up more than 99% of the population of the Town. Qasimabad is known as a Sindhi based town. Although it was formed after the town of Latifabad, it does not follow the numbered unit system for that town, but instead is based on the block system.

The Town consists of the western part of the Hyderabad city and houses three of the most popular and biggest schools in the city: St Bonaventure's High School, The City School and Beaconhouse School System, The Science Foundation College & Academy, along with other popular schools such as: Bahria Foundation College, Agha Taj Muhammad High School, one of oldest schools in Qasimabad town, Eden Grammar School and Sindh Academy High School, St Mary's convent school, Khan Muhammad High School, Anne High School.

Culture and society
With people, mostly Sindhi, occupying this region, the practice of Sindhology or the study of Sindh is more pronounced in this region than others. There is a museum celebrating the treasures of its Sindhi cultural values and traditions present in this town, the Sindh Museum. Qasimabad is the hub of Sindhi Nationalist and political Powers and almost all the Sindhi Nationalist political parties have their head offices in Qasimabad City.

Localities
The prominent localities/Town Regions of Qasimabad are: Nasim Nagar, Main Qasimabad, New Wahdat Colony, Old Wahdat Colony, Sheedi Goth, Qasimabad Phase-I, Phase-II, Sindhi Muslims Society, Memon Society, Prince Town, Al-Mustafa Town, Hyderabad Town, Abdullah Town, Sahrish Nagar, London Town, Bond Street, Rani Bagh, Sindh Museum, Citizen Colony, Gul-E-Latif Housing Scheme, Anwar Villas, Faraz Villas, Waqar Town, Marvi Town, Abdullah Town, Abdullah Centre, Abdullah Vally, Gulistan-e-Sajjad and Gulshan-e-Sehr, Alamadar Chowk, Momin Nagar, Waadhu Wah, Bhittai Town & Bhittai Nagar.

References

External links
 Qasimabad Administration

Neighbourhoods of Hyderabad, Sindh